Lazy eye refers to several specific ophthalmic disorders:

Medicine 
 Amblyopia, a disorder of visual development in which the brain partially or wholly ignores input from one or both eyes
 Strabismus, a disorder of ocular alignment in which the eyes aim in different directions
 Ptosis (eyelid), drooping or falling of the upper or lower eyelid

Art and entertainment 
 Lazy Eye (film), 2016 American film
 Lazy Eye (Goo Goo Dolls song), a song recorded by the Goo Goo Dolls for the soundtrack of the 1997 film Batman & Robin
 Lazy Eye (Silversun Pickups song), the third single from Silversun Pickups' debut album Carnavas